The California Business, Transportation and Housing Agency (BTH) was a state cabinet-level agency in the government of California. It was superseded by the new California State Transportation Agency (CalSTA) on July 1, 2013.

The Business, Transportation and Housing Agency was responsible for oversight of 14 offices and departments and four economic development programs and initiatives within the state government. The Agency's portfolio was one of the largest and most diverse in the State of California.  As the lead State Agency for economic development, BT&H strove to maintain and enhance California's leading role in the global economy through the Agency's programs.  Its operations addressed a myriad of issues that directly impacted the state's economic vitality and quality of life including transportation, public safety, affordable housing, international trade, financial services, tourism, and managed health care.

From March 2012, the Acting Secretary for Business, Transportation and Housing was Brian P. Kelly.

Organization
Effective July 1, 2013, the Business, Transportation, and Housing Agency ceased to exist and became the new California State Transportation Agency (CalSTA) in accordance with the Governor's Reorganization Plan No. 2.

Former Departments
 Department of Alcoholic Beverage Control
 California Department of Transportation
 California Housing Finance Agency
 California Department of Business Oversight
 California Highway Patrol
 Department of Housing and Community Development
 Department of Motor Vehicles
 Department of Real Estate
 Office of Traffic Safety
 Office of Real Estate Appraisers
 Board of Pilot Commissioners

Programs & Initiatives
 California Film Commission - CFC
 California Office of Tourism
 California Infrastructure and Economic Development Bank - I-BANK
 Small Business Loan Guarantee Program - SBLGP

See also

Notes

Business, Transportation and Housing Agency
2013 disestablishments in California